Darreh Lar may refer to:
 Darreh Lar Abdol Karim
 Darreh Lar Karim